Viva Cinema (formerly Viva TV) is a Philippine entertainment television channel owned by Viva Communications, available on satellite and cable TV providers.

History
The channel was launched as Viva Cinema on February 1, 2009, the day Cignal Digital TV also began operation. The channel's programming line-up consisted of previous teleseries produced by Viva Television, Filipino films and Hollywood films, as well as televised interviews related to upcoming domestic and international films.

On July 16, 2012, the channel was relaunched as Viva TV, and began broadcasting music videos, talk shows, reality series, concerts and behind the scenes from films featuring some of Viva Communications artists, including Sarah Geronimo, Anne Curtis, KC Concepcion, among others.

After nine years and sixteen days, Viva TV ends its broadcast operations on July 31, 2021, and it has reverted to Viva Cinema effective on August 1, 2021, after the former transitioned to and merged with Viva Communications' television production arm unit while the latter returned its broadcast operations as the third incarnation channel featuring archived movies produced and distributed by Viva Films which were produced up to the year 1995 (since August 2022, until 1996), as well as Island Living and concerts.

Programming

Current
As of February 4, 2023, Viva Cinema is divided into various programming blocks:
 Dramacine – a block consisting of drama films. It airs Weekdays at 8:00 AM and 10:00 PM.
 Aksyoncine – a block consisting of action films. It airs Everyday at 10:00 AM, and Weekdays at 12:00 NN and 4:00 PM.
 Comedycine – a block consisting of comedy films. It airs Weekdays at 2:00 PM and 6:00 PM.
 Viva Cinema Presents – a block consisting of films starring their featured artist for the week. It airs Weeknights at 8:00 PM.
 Back to Back Cine – a block consisting of back to back films based on certain themes. It airs Weekends at 12:00 NN.
 Fantacine – a block consisting of fantasy films. It airs Saturdays at 6:00 PM.
 Sabado Cine – a block consisting of digitally restored films. It airs Saturdays at 8:00 PM.
 Concert Cine – a block consisting of archived concerts. It airs Sundays at 8:00 PM.
 Island Living (also broadcast on PBO and All TV)

Former (as Viva TV)

 Anong Ganap? (2017–2021 Viva TV; still airs on PBO and streaming via VivaMax)
 Daily Top 10 (2012–2021)
 OPM TV (2017–2021)
 Especially4 You (2012–2021)
 ANNEbishowsa (2012–2021)
 Live at Amerasian (2012–2021)
 Rap Sessions (2014–2021)
 Karaokray (2012–2021)
 Dobol or Samting (2014–2021)
 Pinoy Star Stories (2012–2021)
 Front Row (Concerts from Viva Live) (2012–2021)
 #JADINE (2014–2020)
 Wapak (2012–2021)
 StarBiz
 Star Yayey (2012–2021)
 CineBest (a Filipino movies from PBO) (2017–2021)
 SinePalooza (a Hollywood movies from TMC) (2017–2021)
 Star Homes (2017–2021)
 The Jon Santos Show (2012–present)
 Chillin' with Chicser (2013–2021)
 Oh My Guardians (2017–2021)
 OneSong (2018)
 Pantaxa 
 Popstar Diaries (2012–2019)
 KC.Com
 Becky Nights
 Petra's Panniest 
 The OPM Show

See also
 Viva Entertainment
 Viva Television
 Pinoy Box Office (formerly known as Viva Cinema until 2003)
 Viva TV (IBC programming block)
 Sari-Sari Channel

References

External links
 Official Website
 
 

Viva Entertainment
Television channels and stations established in 2009
Television networks in the Philippines
Entertainment companies of the Philippines
Filipino-language television stations
Mass media in Metro Manila
Television in Metro Manila